Nicholas Derencsényi was a Hungarian nobleman from the House of Derencsényi, who served as Count of the Székelys from 1377 to 1380.

References

Sources
 Engel, Pál (1996). Magyarország világi archontológiája, 1301–1457, I. ("Secular Archontology of the Kingdom of Hungary, 1301–1457, Volume I."). História, MTA Történettudományi Intézete. Budapest. .

1380 deaths
Counts of the Székelys
Nicholas
Year of birth unknown